Pingbian Miao Autonomous County is a county located in Honghe Hani and Yi Autonomous Prefecture in the southeast of Yunnan province, People's Republic of China. Its seat is located only  from the border with Lào Cai Province, Vietnam.

Administrative divisions
Pingbian Miao Autonomous County has 4 towns and 3 townships. 
4 towns

3 townships
 Baiyun
 Xinhua
 Wantang

Climate
Pingbian County has a mild subtropical highland climate (Köppen Cwb) influenced by its elevation, with short, mild, dry winters and warm, humid summers. The greatest rainfall tends to occur during the summer; spring is the sunniest season.

Note that extreme temperature data is combined from NOAA (1961−1990) and China Weather (1971−2000)

Transportation
The narrow-gauge Kunming–Hai Phong Railway crosses Pingbian County. This railway's famous Faux Namti Bridge is located north of the county's Wantang Township.

References

External links

Pingbian County Official Website

County-level divisions of Honghe Prefecture
Miao autonomous counties